The Assam Mail was one of the better known metre-gauge trains in the Indian Railways system that was there from the pre-independence days. The train was discontinued in 1986 with the completion of the broad-gauge conversion of the metre-gauge line to Dibrugarh.

3 Up/ 4 Dn

It travelled along the Santahar–Kaunia line up to Kaunia, then to  along Parbatipur–Lalmonirhat–Burimari line, crossing the Teesta.

Passengers to and from Kolkata and the rest of India traveled between Kolkata and Santahar by broad-gauge Darjeeling Mail or some other connection and then switched over to metre-gauge Assam Mail.

Post Independence

After independence and partition of India in 1947, the train travel to Assam stopped temporarily (possibly till 1957). When Assam Link Project connected  to  Assam Mail started running along the Katihar–Siliguri line. Assam Mail was converted into a two part train. Passengers had to get down at Barauni and change trains.

The metre gauge part of the Assam Mail from Barauni to Dibrugarh covered . It was one of the longer metre gauge runs in the country, running across the flood plains of the Kosi, the Dooars, Western Assam and finally Upper Assam.

References

Transport in Delhi
Transport in Guwahati
Transport in Dibrugarh
Named passenger trains of India
Defunct trains in India
Rail transport in Delhi
Rail transport in Assam
Rail transport in West Bengal
Rail transport in Bihar
Rail transport in Uttar Pradesh